Coláiste an Phiarsaigh is a coeducational voluntary secondary school in Glanmire, Cork. Irish is the language of instruction and all pupils and teachers are expected to converse in Irish. The school is free for day pupils and fee-paying for boarders, though some bursaries are available.

Gaedhealachas Teoranta established the school in 1973. it is named after Patrick Pearse, an Irish revolutionary and Gaelic revivalist. Cormac Mac Cárthaigh was one of the founders, and Eibhlín Ní Drisceoil was principal from 1973 to 1991. In 1978, with about 200 students enrolled, the first permanent building was opened. In the eighties when student numbers increased, prefabs were opened. A permanent extension building opened in 1995, with a science lab, computer room, art room, classrooms, staff room and offices. In the 2011–12 school year, the enrolment was 255 boys and 281 girls. Irish-language courses for children 10-14 are held in the school during the summer holidays.

In The Sunday Times 2013 ranking of progression to third-level education, the school ranked 5th in Cork city and county, and 22nd in the state

References

External links
 colaisteanphiarsaigh.ie School website

1973 establishments in Ireland
Educational institutions established in 1973
Gaelcholáiste
Irish-language schools and college
Secondary schools in County Cork